DWKB (99.3 FM) was a radio station owned and operated by Bright Light Broadcasting. Its studios and transmitter were located in Santiago, Isabela.

References

Radio stations in Isabela (province)
Radio stations established in 1992
Radio stations disestablished in 2003
Defunct radio stations in the Philippines